The 1997 Nebraska Cornhuskers football team represented the University of Nebraska–Lincoln in the 1997 NCAA Division I-A football season. The team was led by 25th-year head coach Tom Osborne and played their home games in Memorial Stadium in Lincoln, Nebraska. The Cornhuskers competed as members of the Big 12 Conference in the league's second year of existence.

The Cornhuskers compiled a perfect 13–0 record and claimed their third national championship in four years. Nebraska was ranked first in the final Coaches Poll of the year, but was ranked second behind Michigan (also undefeated, at 12–0) in the final AP Poll. Of the 20 official championship selectors designated by the NCAA, 13 selected Nebraska as national champions, six selected Michigan, and one declared them co-champions. It remains one of the most hotly contested national championship debates in college football history.

Nebraska secured their first Big 12 Conference championship by defeating Texas A&M by a score of 54–15 in the Big 12 Championship Game. Nebraska had been upset by Texas in the inaugural Big 12 Championship Game in 1996. The season ended with a 42–17 victory over No. 3 Tennessee in the 1998 Orange Bowl for their fourth consecutive major bowl victory.

The Nebraska offense, which led the country in scoring, was led by quarterback Scott Frost and running back Ahman Green. Frost became just the tenth player in college football history to both pass and run for 1,000 yards. Green finished second in the country in rushing yards with 1,877 yards, and tied for third in touchdowns with 22. Offensive lineman Aaron Taylor was named a consensus All-American and was the recipient of the Outland Trophy. The Cornhusker defense was anchored by All-American defensive linemen Jason Peter and Grant Wistrom, winner of the Lombardi Award.

Head coach Tom Osborne announced after the regular season that the Orange Bowl would be his final game as head coach. He retired as Nebraska's all-time winningest coach, and was sixth in wins all-time in major college football history at the time of his retirement.

Schedule

Roster and coaching staff

Depth chart

Game summaries

Akron

UCF

Washington

Kansas State

Baylor

Texas Tech

Kansas

Oklahoma

Missouri

Iowa State

Colorado

Texas A&M

Tennessee

Statistics
 QB Scott Frost: 88/159 (55.3%) for 1,237 yards (7.80) with 5 TD vs. 4 INT (2.52%). 176 carries for 1,095 yards (6.22) and 19 TD.
 RB Ahman Green: 278 carries for 1,877 yards (6.75) with 22 TD. 16 catches for 151 yards and 0 TD.
 FB Joel Makovicka: 105 carries for 685 yards (6.52) and 9 TD.
 RB Correll Buckhalter: 54 carries for 311 yards (5.76) and 6 TD.
 WR Lance Brown: 12 catches for 226 yards (18.83) and 0 TD.
 WR Matt Davison: 10 catches for 219 yards (21.90) and 1 TD.

Rankings

After the season
Nebraska Head Coach Tom Osborne announced his retirement just prior to the 1998 Orange bowl, capping a remarkable career of success.  The #2 Cornhuskers handily defeated the #3 Tennessee Volunteers 42-17, while #1 Michigan defeated #7 Washington State team 21-16.  In postgame coverage on the field, Nebraska quarterback Scott Frost openly lobbied Coaches Poll voters for support based on performance comparisons between Nebraska and Michigan.  The voters apparently agreed, as Nebraska was ranked #1 in the final Coaches Poll, while Michigan retained their pre-bowl #1 ranking in the AP Poll, creating a split National Championship.   The 1997 Huskers set an NCAA record that still stands by scoring an average of 5.5 rushing touchdowns per game (66 rushing touchdowns in twelve games, not including the six scored in the Orange Bowl).

Awards

NFL and pro players
The following Nebraska players who participated in the 1997 season later moved on to the next level and joined a professional or semi-pro team as draftees or free agents.

References

Nebraska
Nebraska Cornhuskers football seasons
College football national champions
Big 12 Conference football champion seasons
Orange Bowl champion seasons
College football undefeated seasons
Nebraska Cornhuskers football